Shehryar Khan Afridi (born 12 March 1971) is a Pakistani politician who serves as Chairperson of the Parliamentary Special Committee on Kashmir, in office since 13 May 2020. He served as the Minister of State for Interior from 31 August 2018 to 18 April 2019. He had been a member of the National Assembly of Pakistan from August 2018 till January 2023. Previously, he was also a member of the National Assembly from June 2013 to May 2018. He is serving as the Minister of State for States and Frontier Regions (SAFRON) since 18 April 2019. He was also given an additional charge of the Ministry of Narcotics Control after the death of Ali Mohammad Mahar.

Early life and education
He was born on 12 March 1971.

He received a master's degree in International Relations from the University of Peshawar. He wanted to join the Civil Services of Pakistan but was not selected as he failed in the examination.

Political career

Member of the National Assembly of Pakistan
Afridi ran for the seat of National Assembly of Pakistan as an independent candidate from Constituency NA-14 (Kohat) in 2002 Pakistani general election but was unsuccessful. He received 12,083 votes and lost the seat to a candidate of Muttahida Majlis-e-Amal.

Afridi was elected to the National Assembly as a candidate of Pakistan Tehreek-e-Insaf (PTI) from Constituency NA-14 (Kohat) in 2013 Pakistani general election. He received 68,129 votes and defeated a candidate of Jamiat Ulema-e Islam (F) (JUI-F). He was re-elected to the National Assembly as a candidate of PTI from Constituency NA-32 (Kohat) in 2018 Pakistani general election. He received 82,248 votes and defeated Gohar Mohammad Khan Bangash, a candidate of Muttahida Majlis-e-Amal (MMA).

Minister of State for Interior
On 28 August 2018, he was named by Prime Minister Imran Khan as Minister of State for Interior. On 31 August 2018, he was sworn in as Minister of State for Interior in the federal cabinet of PM Imran Khan.

Minister of State for States and Frontier Regions
On 18 April 2019, he resigned as Minister of State for Interior, and was appointed as the minister of state for States and Frontier regions.

Minister of State for Narcotics Control (Additional Charge)
Later he was given the additional portfolio of Ministry of Narcotics Control. On 29 September 2020 after the approval of Prime Minister Imran Khan, Minister of State for Narcotics Shehryar Afridi was removed from the post.

Residence controversy
In October 2018, Afridi was accused of using public funds worth millions of rupees to renovate and redecorate his new residence. Following which Prime Minister Imran Khan took notice of the issue and ordered Federal Investigation Agency to carry out the investigation.

Personal life
In May 2020, Afridi tested positive for COVID-19 during the coronavirus pandemic in Pakistan.

References

Pakistan Tehreek-e-Insaf MNAs
Pakistani MNAs 2018–2023
People from Kohat District
Living people
Pakistani MNAs 2013–2018
1971 births
University of Peshawar alumni